The Apertura 2013 season is the 31st edition of Primera División de Fútbol de El Salvador since its establishment of an Apertura and Clausura format. Firpo are the defending champions. The league will consist of 10 teams, each playing a home and away game against the other clubs for a total of 18 games, respectively. The top four teams at the end of the regular season will take part of the playoffs.

Team information
A total of 10 teams will contest the league, including nine sides from the Clausura 2013 and one promoted from the 2012–13 Segunda División.

Once Municipal were relegated to 2013–14 Segunda División the previous season.

The relegated team were replaced by 2012–13 Segunda División Playoffs promotion winner. Ciclon de Golfo won the Apertura 2012 title, this led to take part of the promotion playoffs along with the Clausura 2013 champions side C.D. Dragon. Dragon won the playoffs by the score of 3–1.

Promotion and relegation
Promoted from Segunda División de Fútbol Salvadoreño as of June 6, 2013.
Champions: C.D. Dragón
Relegated to Segunda División de Fútbol Salvadoreño as of June 6, 2012.
Last Place: Once Municipal

Controversy
Twelve players were banned for life from playing football after they were found guilty for match fixing El Salvador international match fixtures. ten of those players played their football in El Salvador, which caused the clubs affected to  replace them mid season.
The clubs affected from the match fixing scandals including Águila with four players banned for life (Luis Anaya, Darwin Bonilla, José Henríquez, Reynaldo Hernández), Firpo with three players banned for life(Christian Castillo, Dagoberto Portillo, Dennis Alas) and one player banned for 18 months Carlos Romeo Monteagudo, Alianza with two players banned for life (Osael Romero, Miguel Montes), FAS with two players banned for life (Miguel Granadino, Ramón Flores), Metapan with one player banned for life Alfredo Pacheco and one player banned for six month Eliseo Quintanilla, and Santa Tecla F.C. with one player banned for life Marvin González .

Stadia and locations

Personnel and sponsoring

Managerial changes

Before the start of the season

During the season

League table

Results

Playoffs

Semi-finals

First leg

Second leg

Final

Top goalscorers

List of foreign players in the league
This is a list of foreign players in Apertura 2013. The following players:
have played at least one apertura game for the respective club.
have not been capped for the El Salvador national football team on any level, independently from the birthplace

A new rule was introduced a few season ago, that clubs can only have three foreign players per club and can only add a new player if there is an injury or player/s is released.

C.D. Águila
  Óscar Morera 
  Héctor Amarilla 
   Eddie Ababio
  Sergio Thompson
  Oscar Zepeda

Alianza F.C.
  Jonathan Faña
  Diego Passarelli
  Sean Fraser

Atlético Marte
  Mauro Aldave  
  Miller Lazarazo
  Gonzalo Mazzia

C.D. Dragón
  Jhony Rios
  Jimmy Valoyes
  Mario Sergio Angulo

Juventud Independiente
  Kelvin Palacios 
  Jesús Toscanini
  Augustine Jibrin

 (player released during the season)

C.D. FAS
  Alejandro Bentos
  Jefferson Viveros
  Martín Morales 
  Cristian Noriega

C.D. Luis Ángel Firpo
  Anel Canales
  Carlos Martinez Abidel
  Jeremie Lynch

A.D. Isidro Metapán
  Ernesto Aquino
  Héctor Ramos
  Junio Pinto Catarin

Santa Tecla F.C.
  Facundo Nicolás Simioli
  Bruno Camilletti
  Christian Vaquero

UES
  Klayton da Silva
  Cristian Gil Mosquera
  Martín Mederos

References

External links
 http://www.primerafutboles.com/
 http://www.elgrafico.com/
 http://www.elsalvadorfc.com/
 http://www.culebritamacheteada.com.sv/
 http://www.elsalvadorfutbol.com/

Primera División de Fútbol Profesional Apertura seasons
El
1